Althepus was in Greek mythology a son of the Greek god Poseidon and Leïs, a daughter of Orus, king of Troezen. The territory of Troezen was called "Althepia" after him. In his reign Poseidon and Athena disputed the possession of the country with each other.

Althepus was the successor of Orus, and was succeeded by Saron.

References

Children of Poseidon
Troezenian mythology